Nokuthula Tshabangu (born 22 July 1965) is a boxer from Zimbabwe, who competed in the flyweight (– 51 kg) division at the 1988 Summer Olympics. In his first round bout, he defeated Bonifacio Garcia of Spain before losing to Kim Kwang-sun of South Korea in his second fight. He won a silver medal at the 1990 Commonwealth Games in the flyweight division, losing in the final to Wayne McCullough of Northern Ireland.

Tshabangu had a professional record of 7 wins and 9 losses from 1993 to 2003. His losses included a second round knockout defeat to Jason Booth in Nottingham for the Commonwealth Flyweight Title on 26 February 2001.

References

External links
 

1965 births
Living people
Flyweight boxers
Olympic boxers of Zimbabwe
Boxers at the 1988 Summer Olympics
Zimbabwean male boxers
Boxers at the 1990 Commonwealth Games
Commonwealth Games silver medallists for Zimbabwe
Commonwealth Games medallists in boxing
Medallists at the 1990 Commonwealth Games